Affinity Group may refer to:
Affinity group, a small group of political activists
Affinity Group Inc., a provider of products and services to the recreational vehicle (RV) market